This is a list of premiers of New South Wales by time in office. The basis of the list is the inclusive number of days between dates.

Rank by time in office

Total time in office of Australian political parties
New South Wales Parliament –  days as of   
 Before Parties –  days
 Liberalism – {{#expr:
 + 1 + 
 + 1 + 
 + 1 + 
 + 1 + 
 + 1 + 
 + 1 + 
 + 1 + 
 + 1 + 
 + 1 + 
 + 1 + 
 + 1 + 
 + 1 
 }} days

Since 7 October 1885
 Labor Party – {{#expr:
 + 1 + 
 + 1 + 
 + 1 + 
 + 1 + 
 + 1 + 
 + 1 + 
 + 1 + 
 + 1 + 
 + 1 + 
 + 1 + 
 + 1 + 
 + 1 + 
 + 1 + 
 + 1 + 
 + 1 + 
 + 1 + 
 + 1 + 
 
 }} days
 Liberal Party – {{#expr:
 + 1 + 
 + 1 + 
 + 1 + 
 + 1 + 
 + 1 + 
 + 1 + 
 
}} days as of   
 Protectionist Party – {{#expr:
 + 1 + 
 + 1 + 
 + 1 + 
 + 1 + 
 + 1 
}} days
 Progressive Party – {{#expr:
 + 1 + 
 + 1 
}} days
 Liberal Reform Party – {{#expr:
 + 1 
}} days
 Liberal Reform Party – {{#expr:
 + 1 
}} days
 Liberalism (Non Party) – {{#expr:
 + 1 
}} days

Notes

See also
 Premier of New South Wales
 List of prime ministers of Australia by time in office
 List of Australian heads of government by time in office
 List of premiers of Queensland by time in office
 List of premiers of South Australia by time in office
 List of premiers of Tasmania by time in office
 List of premiers of Western Australia by time in office
 List of premiers of Victoria by time in office
 List of chief ministers of the Northern Territory by time in office
List of chief ministers of the Australian Capital Territory by time in office

New South Wales
Premiers
New South Wales, Premiers
Lists of political office-holders in New South Wales